Ruth Elizabeth Moss Easterling (December 26, 1910 – November 1, 2006) was a Democratic member of the North Carolina House of Representatives for thirteen terms.  She was born December 26, 1910, in Blacksburg, South Carolina.  She was an alumnus of Limestone College and Appalachian State University.

After serving on the city council of Charlotte, Easterling was first elected to the legislature in 1976, at age 65. Before retirement she was the co-chairwoman of the appropriations committee. She retired in 2002 at age 92, at which time she was the longest serving female legislator from North Carolina. She represented a district in Mecklenburg County.  At the end of her time, she was ranked the seventh in effectiveness among North Carolina legislators by the North Carolina Center for Public Policy Research.

Easterling died on November 1, 2006, at age 95, of congestive heart failure.

References

External links

|-

External links
News & Observer obituary
News & Observer editorial

1910 births
2006 deaths
People from Gaffney, South Carolina
Democratic Party members of the North Carolina House of Representatives
Appalachian State University alumni
Women state legislators in North Carolina
Limestone University alumni
20th-century American politicians
20th-century American women politicians
People from Blacksburg, South Carolina
21st-century American women